Lilium superbum is a species of true lily native to the eastern and central regions of North America. Common names include Turk's cap lily, turban lily, swamp lily, lily royal, or American tiger lily. The native range of the species extends from southern New Hampshire, Massachusetts, and New York, west to Illinois, Missouri, and Arkansas, and south to Georgia, Alabama, Mississippi, and Florida.

Description
It is capable of growing in wet conditions. It is fairly variable in size, form, and color. The color is known to range from a deep yellow to orange to a reddish-orange "flame" coloring with reddish petal tips. The flowers have a green star at their center that can be used to distinguish L. superbum from the Asiatic "tigerlilies" that frequently escape from cultivation. It grows in swamps, woods, and wet meadows.

Uses
The roots were a food source for Native Americans, and the flowers provide nectar for hummingbirds and larger insects.

Status
It is listed as endangered in Florida, New Hampshire, Alberta and Saskatchewan and threatened in Kentucky, and exploitably vulnerable in New York.

Etymology
The Turk's cap common name is derived from the reflexed shape of the flower petals, which presumably resemble a type of hat worn by early Turkish people.

Toxicity

Cats
Cats are extremely sensitive to lily toxicity and ingestion is often fatal; households and gardens that are visited by cats are strongly advised against keeping this plant or placing dried flowers where a cat may brush against them and become dusted with pollen that they then consume while cleaning. Suspected cases require urgent veterinary attention. Rapid treatment with activated charcoal and/or induced vomiting can reduce the amount of toxin absorbed (this is time-sensitive so in some cases vets may advise doing it at home), and large amounts of fluid by IV can reduce damage to kidneys to increase the chances of survival.

Traditional uses
The bulbs were made into soups by some Native Americans.

References

External links
USDA Plants Profile for Lilium superbum (turk's-cap lily)
 Missouri Botanical Garden, Kemper Center for Home Gardening: Turkscap lily (Lilium superbum)
 Lady Bird Johnson Wildflower Center Native Plant Information Network−NPIN: Lilium superbum (Turk's-cap lily) — with horticultural info.

superbum
Flora of the Eastern United States
Flora of the Northeastern United States
Flora of the Southeastern United States
Flora of the Appalachian Mountains
Plants described in 1753
Taxa named by Carl Linnaeus
Endangered flora of the United States
Flora without expected TNC conservation status